RedMon, Redirection Port Monitor, redirects a special printer port to a program on Microsoft Windows operating systems. It is commonly used with Ghostscript to generate PostScript (PS) and Portable Document Format (PDF) files from any application.

See also
List of virtual printer software

External links
 RedMon homepage

Windows-only free software